Porto Dinheiro (or Praia de Porto Dinheiro) is a locality in the civil parish (freguesia) of Ribamar, municipality of Lourinhã, in Portugal.

It is known as a rich fossil locality, from where were found many Late Jurassic dinosaurs and mammals. A few even received the locality name, like the Dinheirosaurus lourinhanensis and Jurassic mammals like Portopinheirodon asymmetricus and the multituberculates family Pinheirodontidae. The second one is the based for a new family of mammals, the Pinheirodontidae. An diverse ichnofauna is known in that site.

This locality was once considered to be early Cretaceous in age, but it is Tithonian (Late Jurassic).

References

External links
Map of Porto Dinheiro

Lourinhã
Populated places in Lisbon District